Scott Anthony Murray Nelson (born 10 October 1969 in Auckland) is a New Zealand athlete specialising in race walking. He competed for New Zealand at the 1994 Commonwealth Games, winning a bronze in the 30 km road walk. At the 1996 Summer Olympics he came 32nd in the 20 km road walk, with a time of 1 hr 25m 50s.

He attended High School at Waitākere College.

Achievements

References 
Athletes at the Games by John Clark, page 88 (1998, Athletics New Zealand) 
Profile at NZOGC website
IAAF Fact & Figures

External links

1969 births
Athletes (track and field) at the 1994 Commonwealth Games
Athletes (track and field) at the 1996 Summer Olympics
Commonwealth Games bronze medallists for New Zealand
New Zealand male racewalkers
Olympic athletes of New Zealand
Living people
Athletes from Auckland
Commonwealth Games medallists in athletics
Medallists at the 1994 Commonwealth Games